Öçpoçmaq (Tatar and ,) is a Tatar and Bashkir national dish, an essential food in Tatar and Bashkir culture. It is a triangular pastry, filled with chopped meat, onion and potatoes. Öçpoçmaq is usually eaten with bouillon or with tea.

Uchpuchmaks have been cooked for centuries by nomad Turkic people. Lamb, and, sometimes, horse meat was used to make a triangular pie. An opening on the top was used to add broth immediately before eating which made it a hot meal. This made cooking in the field fast and easy.

For most of the Soviet period, much of the Tatar cuisine including uchpuchmaks was removed from public catering due to clumsy overregulation. In the late 60s, Yunus Ahmetjanov, a legendary chef pushed for recognition of uchpuchmak, chakchak and other Tatar meals on the unionwide level and was successful in promoting them to public catering menus all across the Soviet Union.

Presently, uchpuchmaks are often made without an opening, however, it's still served with meat broth in a separate bowl. Beef is the prevalent filling today; other varieties contain goose and duck meat.

See also
 Tatar böreği in Turkey
 Fatayer
 List of pastries
 List of Russian dishes
 Pasty
 Peremech
 Qistibi
 Samsa

Notes

References

Russian pastries
Tatar cuisine
Bashkir cuisine
Savoury pies
National dishes
Meat dishes